Janus Stark may refer to one of the following:

 Janus Stark, a 1960s British comic strip by Tom Tully and Francisco Solano López.
 Janus Stark (band), a British punk band named after this comic strip.